The King (French: Le roi) is a 1949 French comedy film directed by Marc-Gilbert Sauvajon and starring Maurice Chevalier, Annie Ducaux and Sophie Desmarets. It is a remake of the 1936 film The King.

It was shot at the Victorine Studios in Nice. The film's sets were designed by the art directors Guy de Gastyne and Paul-Louis Boutié.

Synopsis
It follows the adventures of King Jean IV of Cerdagne when he visits Paris to sign an important treaty.

Cast
 Maurice Chevalier as The King Jean IV de Cerdagne
 Annie Ducaux as Therese Marnix
 Sophie Desmarets as Mme Youyou Bourdier
 Alfred Adam as Bourdier
 Jean Wall as Le Lorrain
 Robert Murzeau as Blond
 Henri Charrett as Cormeau, Minister of Commerce
 Marcel Delaître as Count Martin de Mortier 
 Félix Paquet as Gabrier, Postmaster General
 François Joux as Marcel Rivelot
 Lucien Callamand as Dominique
 Roger Monteaux as Aubergiste
 Albert Michel as Un inspecteur
 Jacqueline Noëlle as Jeune veuve 
 Robert Vattier as Marquis de Chamarande

References

Bibliography 
 Goble, Alan. The Complete Index to Literary Sources in Film. Walter de Gruyter, 1999.

External links 
 

1949 films
1949 comedy films
French comedy films
1940s French-language films
Films directed by Marc-Gilbert Sauvajon
Films shot at Victorine Studios
French films based on plays
Films set in Paris
1940s French films